Never is a 2014 drama film written and directed by Brett Allen Smith and starring Zelda Williams and Zachary Booth.

Plot
A lesbian and a straight man fall into a quasi-romance.

References

External links

American independent films
2014 films
American romantic drama films
American LGBT-related films
2014 LGBT-related films
LGBT-related romantic drama films
2014 romantic drama films
2014 independent films
2010s English-language films
2010s American films